Edgar Henry Faler (July 3, 1893 – February 27 1960) was an American football coach. He served as the head football coach at Sterling College in Sterling, Kansas for one season, in 1921, compiling a record of 1–6.

Head coaching record

References

External links
 

1893 births
1960 deaths
Sterling Warriors football coaches
Emporia State University alumni
People from Anderson County, Kansas